Nick Crawford (born January 2, 1990) is a Canadian ice hockey player who is currently playing for Rødovre Mighty Bulls in the danish Superisligaen. Having last played for DVTK Jegesmedvék in the Tipsport liga (Slovak). He was selected in the 6th round (164th overall) of the 2008 NHL Entry Draft by the Buffalo Sabres.

Playing career

Amateur
Crawford grew up playing minor hockey in the Toronto area and played for the Chinguacousy Blues, Vaughan Kings, Mississauga Rebels and Don Mills Flyers. He was a member of the 2003 All-Ontario Peewee Champion Vaughan Kings and the 2005-06 GTHL Champion Don Mills Flyers.

After minor hockey, Crawford was selected in the 1st round (12th overall) of the 2006 OHL Priority Selection by the Saginaw Spirit. He played junior hockey in the Ontario Hockey League with the Saginaw Spirit and Barrie Colts. In 2010, he was named to the OHL First All-Star Team and the CHL First All-Star Team.

In his final season of OHL hockey, Crawford became the first defenseman in OHL history to lead the league in Defenseman Scoring and Plus/Minus in the same season.

Professional
Crawford began the 2010–11 season in the American Hockey League with the Portland Pirates. During his four years within the Buffalo Sabres organization, Crawford remained in the AHL with the Rochester Americans.

On October 13, 2014, after he was unable to secure an NHL contract, Crawford opted to begin a career abroad in signing a one-year contract with Austrian club, Dornbirner EC of the EBEL.

Career statistics

References

External links

1990 births
Living people
Barrie Colts players
Buffalo Sabres draft picks
Canadian ice hockey defencemen
DVTK Jegesmedvék players
Esbjerg Energy players
Dornbirn Bulldogs players
Ice hockey people from Ontario
People from Caledon, Ontario
Portland Pirates players
Rochester Americans players
Saginaw Spirit players
Canadian expatriate ice hockey players in Austria
Canadian expatriate ice hockey players in Denmark